Fanous is a surname. Notable people with the surname include: 

Akhnoukh Fanous (1856–1946), Egyptian politician
Ester Fanous (1895–1990), Egyptian feminist
Isaac Fanous (1919–2007), Egyptian artist and scholar
Lawrence Fanous (born 1985), Jordanian triathlete
Wagih Fanous (born 1948), Lebanese critic, academic, and researcher